Castus was an enslaved Gallic man who, together with the Thracian Spartacus, the fellow Gaul Crixus, and Celt Gannicus, alongside  Oenomaus, was one of the leaders of rebellious slaves during the Third Servile War (73–71 BC). He was killed along with his co-commander Gannicus and their Gallic and Germanic followers by Roman forces under Marcus Licinius Crassus at the Battle of Cantenna in Lucania in 71 BC.

References

Ancient sources
 Plutarch, Crassus 11, 2–3.

Secondary literature
 
 
 

1st-century BC Romans
Celtic warriors
Gaulish people
Rebel slaves in ancient Rome
Roman gladiators
Third Servile War
71 BC deaths
Year of birth unknown